Histone-lysine N-methyltransferase NSD3 is an enzyme that in humans is encoded by the WHSC1L1 gene.

This gene is related to the Wolf–Hirschhorn syndrome candidate-1 gene and encodes a protein with PWWP (proline-tryptophan-tryptophan-proline) domains. The function of the protein has not been determined. Two alternatively spliced variants have been described.

The WHSC1L1 gene is amplified in several cancers, including lung cancer and head and neck cancer, and may play a role in carcinogenesis.

References

Further reading